Erik Carlsen (14 April 1911 – 29 January 1999) was a Danish equestrian. He competed in two events at the 1948 Summer Olympics.

References

1911 births
1999 deaths
Danish male equestrians
Olympic equestrians of Denmark
Equestrians at the 1948 Summer Olympics
Sportspeople from Frederiksberg